Petro is a masculine given name, a surname, and an Ancient Roman cognomen. 

Petro may also refer to:

People
 Chanel Petro-Nixon (1989–2006), an American teenager who was strangled to death in Brooklyn, New York, see Death of Chanel Petro-Nixon
 Dražen Petrović (1964–1993), Croatian basketball player in the National Basketball Association
 Alex Pietrangelo (born 1990), Canadian ice hockey player in the National Hockey League

Brands and enterprises
 Petro Air, a charter airline based in Tripoli, Libya
 Petro Express, a former multi-store convenience chain based in Charlotte, North Carolina
 Petro-Canada, a Canadian energy company
 Petro, a chain of travel centers owned by TravelCenters of America

Other uses
 Petro (cryptocurrency), a cryptocurrency developed by the government of Venezuela
 Petro loa, a family of spirits in Haitian Vodou religion, or a drum used in the music of Haiti
 Dan Petro, a loa (family of spirits) in Vodou
 Ti Jean Petro, a snake-loa in Haitian Vodou
 Petro Sport Stadium, a multi-use stadium in Cairo Governorate, Egypt

See also
 Peter (disambiguation)
 Petr (disambiguation)
 Petra (disambiguation)
 Petre (disambiguation)
 Petri (disambiguation)
 Petros (disambiguation)
 Petru
 Petroleum